The fascinating Adiangao Caves is located in the barangay of Adiangao, San Jose, Camarines Sur. The inner part of the cave reveals a seemingly chain of grottoes in an enormous column, as well as numerous stalactites and stalagmites, both along the floor and ceiling which formed like drip-stones or semblance of icicles, and the hanging waterfalls.

References

Caves of the Philippines
Landforms of Camarines Sur